The 1st Parliament of Lower Canada was in session from December 17, 1792, to May 31, 1796. Elections for the Legislative Assembly in Lower Canada had been held in June 1792. All sessions were held at Quebec City.

References

External links 
Les députés au premier Parlement du Bas-Canada (1792-1796), F-J Audet (1946)
Aux fenêtres du Parlement de Québec : histoire, traditions, coutumes, usages, procédures, souvenirs, anecdotes, commissions et autres organismes, D. Potvin (1942)
  Assemblée nationale du Québec (French)

01
1792 establishments in Lower Canada
1796 disestablishments in Lower Canada